Mansfield Dam (formerly Marshall Ford Dam) is a dam located across a canyon at Marshall Ford on the Colorado River,  northwest of Austin, Texas. The groundbreaking ceremony occurred on February 19, 1937, with United States Secretary of the Interior Harold L. Ickes attending. The dam was a joint project by the Lower Colorado River Authority (LCRA) and the United States Bureau of Reclamation, with partial funding provided by the Public Works Administration. Brown and Root, headed by James E. Walters, Sr., was the prime contractor. The dam was completed in 1941. Originally called Marshall Ford Dam, the name was changed in 1941 in honor of United States Representative J.J. Mansfield. The reservoir behind Mansfield Dam is named Lake Travis. The dam is owned and operated by the LCRA.

The concrete gravity dam with embankment wings and saddle dikes was designed to control flooding; to store 1.4 km³ (369 billion US gallons) of water; and to generate hydroelectric power (108 megawatts). LCRA begins to open floods gates when water reaches 681 feet above MSL.

The two lanes of Mansfield Dam Road, formerly RM 620, traverse the top of the dam, but traffic other than service vehicles are now prohibited. 620 was rerouted in 1995 to a four-lane highway bridge on the downstream side of the dam built for increase in traffic due to the popularity in Austin of recreating at Lake Travis.

Political History
Lyndon B. Johnson ran for his first elected office as United States Representative for Texas's 10th congressional district (where the Mansfield Dam was located). His campaign was backed by the dam's contractors, and his success in clearing funding and regulatory hurdles for the dam shortly after his election is considered a cornerstone of his future political career.

References

External links

LCRA Website
Current Water Level Conditions

Buildings and structures in Austin, Texas
Dams in Texas
Buildings and structures in Travis County, Texas
Hydroelectric power plants in Texas
United States Bureau of Reclamation dams
Lower Colorado River Authority dams
Dams completed in 1941
Energy infrastructure completed in 1941
Bridges in Austin, Texas
Crossings of the Colorado River (Texas)
Public Works Administration in Texas